Romeo Island is a rocky island lying off the north coast of Greenwich Island and west of Aitcho Islands in the South Shetland Islands, Antarctica. The area was visited by early 19th century sealers.

The feature is named after the British sealing ship Romeo under Captain James Johnson, which visited the South Shetlands in 1821–22, and moored in Clothier Harbour in March 1822.

Location

See also
 Composite Antarctic Gazetteer
 Greenwich Island
 List of Antarctic islands south of 60° S
 SCAR
 South Shetland Islands
 Territorial claims in Antarctica

Map
 L.L. Ivanov et al. Antarctica: Livingston Island and Greenwich Island, South Shetland Islands. Scale 1:100000 topographic map. Sofia: Antarctic Place-names Commission of Bulgaria, 2005.

References

External links
 SCAR Composite Antarctic Gazetteer.

Islands of the South Shetland Islands